P. J. Walker may refer to:
P. J. Walker (born 1995), American football quarterback
Justin Credible (born 1973), American professional wrestler known early in his career as PJ Walker